Frano Vićan (born 24 January 1976 in Dubrovnik) is a Croatian water polo player who competed in the 2000 Summer Olympics, in the 2004 Summer Olympics, and in the 2008 Summer Olympics.  He was also a member of Croatia's gold medal winning team at the 2012 Summer Olympics.

See also
 Croatia men's Olympic water polo team records and statistics
 List of Olympic champions in men's water polo
 List of Olympic medalists in water polo (men)
 List of players who have appeared in multiple men's Olympic water polo tournaments
 List of men's Olympic water polo tournament goalkeepers
 List of world champions in men's water polo
 List of World Aquatics Championships medalists in water polo

References

External links
 

1976 births
Living people
Sportspeople from Dubrovnik
Croatian male water polo players
Water polo goalkeepers
Water polo players at the 2000 Summer Olympics
Water polo players at the 2004 Summer Olympics
Water polo players at the 2008 Summer Olympics
Water polo players at the 2012 Summer Olympics
Medalists at the 2012 Summer Olympics
Olympic gold medalists for Croatia in water polo
World Aquatics Championships medalists in water polo